Tropical Cyclone Ava was a strong tropical cyclone that brought devastating impacts to parts of eastern Madagascar in January 2018. The first tropical depression, first named storm, and first tropical cyclone of the 2017–18 South-West Indian Ocean cyclone season, Ava formed as a weak area of disturbed weather well northeast of St. Brandon on December 27. Monitored by Météo-France La Réunion (MFR), the disturbance drifted southwest, before intensifying to a moderate tropical storm on January 3. Ava drifted south afterwards with little change in strength; then among favorable conditions near the coast of Madagascar Ava rapidly intensified to tropical cyclone intensity by early on January 5 shortly before making landfall in eastern Madagascar. After landfall, Ava pummeled the region with rainfall and flooding as it weakens into a moderate tropical storm. Ava exited the landmass on January 7 and became post-tropical southeast of southern Madagascar on January 9, slowly drifting southwards as a vigorous low before transitioning into an extratropical cyclone a day later. The extratropical cyclone moved out of basin by January 11.

Ava's catastrophic impact caused at least 51 confirmed deaths in the country, while 22 others were suspected dead. Ava caused at least $195 million (2018 USD) or 744 billion ariary of damage, which was also driven by impacts of the seasonal monsoon which already brought periods of heavy rain and flash flooding in portions of the country. The cyclone significantly impacted the capital of Madagascar, Antananarivo, and destroyed a large portion of the city's infrastructure.

Meteorological history

On December 21, MFR first began noting the potential of cyclonic activity over the basin due to an emerging increase of thunderstorm activity near three weak circulation centers located within the basin, however conditions were considered only marginally favorable due to dry air and an approaching upper-level trough to the east. By December 25, an ill-defined clockwise circulation with minimal convective activity developed south of Diego Garcia. Conditions were expected to steadily become more favorable for some degree of tropical cyclogenesis as an active Madden–Julian oscillation (MJO) pattern settled over the basin and low level convergence increased on the system's northern side. Thunderstorm activity increased around the system by December 26, although erratically as a result of the diurnal cycle, and the center became gradually more defined. This allowed MFR to designate the system Zone of Disturbed Weather 01 by early on December 27, although operationally not until December 29. Organization remained slow for the upcoming days due to the system's elongated center and only slightly conducive conditions. Later on, deep convection began to persist near the circulation. In addition, ground observations from Tromelin Island indicated the system's low-level center was becoming more well defined and met the criteria to be designated a tropical disturbance at 06:00 UTC on January 2. Further observations from scatterometer data suggested the system's center was no longer elongated, and the system was upgraded to a tropical depression the next day. Conditions were considered relatively favorable for rapid intensification due to insignificant wind shear and strong poleward and equatorward low-level convergence. At the time, the disturbance was being steered slowly southwest towards the Malagasy coastline by a subtropical ridge situated over the central part of the basin.

The Joint Typhoon Warning Center (JTWC) also began to initiate advisories on the tropical storm around this time. The storm's movement began to slow down by this point as a low-pressure area south of Madagascar weakened the steering flow from the ridge steering Ava. Now moving in a more southerly direction, Ava changed little in intensity throughout the day with its exposed circulation but wind shear was soon expected to relax. By the next day, the re-strengthening ridge began to push Ava west-southwest into a more favorable environment and thus Ava subsequently began to intensify as a burst of deep convection occurred near the center. The storm quickly intensified from a moderate tropical storm to a severe tropical storm, while the JTWC upgraded the system to the equivalent of a low-end Category 1 hurricane as a central dense overcast bloomed.

Ava made landfall on Toamasina around 16:00 UTC on that same day at peak intensity, before quickly weakening back down to the equivalent of a tropical storm as the eye and eyewall collapsed. Ava slowly meandered south through eastern Madagascar as a weak tropical storm throughout January 6. Under the influence of another upper-level trough, Ava moved to the east while it moved back over sea and exited the Malagasy landmass by early on January 7. A day after, increasing southwesterly shear began to weaken the storm again and displace the thunderstorm activity well away from the center, while ocean heat content became insufficient. The JTWC issued their final advisory on Ava soon afterwards. Ava made a small turn to the southeast before being declared a post-tropical depression by the MFR 12 hours later on January 9. Six hours later, MFR issued their final advisory on Ava as it began transitioning into an extratropical cyclone. By the next day, Ava completed the transition into an extratropical cyclone as it moved quickly to the southeast, and on January 11 the extratropical cyclone had moved out from the basin.

Impact 

The system's precursor low passed over the uninhabited Tromelin Island, though no wind gusts were recorded in the island. In Saint-Denis, Réunion, Ava caused  of rain. Meanwhile, in Mauritius, 200 mm (7.87) inches of rain were received in some regions and these rains caused floods that was damaging to the local agriculture.

As Ava moved towards Madagascar, Meteo Madagascar issued a red alert to the eastern central shores of the country, advising people to be vigilant and compliant to the local authorities. The passage of Ava left 51 dead and 22 missing in the country. Impacts driven by Ava bundled with the seasonal monsoon were estimated to have caused at least US$195 million in total losses. This was measured to have impacted at least 2.9% of the country's total GDP measured from 2017. Around 51,000 residents in the country were left homeless following the storm's exit. 19 health facilities were destroyed by the storm, while 141 schools were affected, including 77 classrooms of these schools that turned into shelters for displaced people. 24,873 people were displaced by the storm and drove 34,641 students out of school. Among the worst hit areas in the country was the capital Antananarivo where many landslides and floods caused hundreds of people to evacuate. The city of Toamasina was heavily impacted as well and over 90% of infrastructure in the port city was destroyed. Towns that had been already impacted by Cyclone Enawo 10 months earlier were impacted by Ava. A dam in Soavina, Betafo was broken and floods destroyed around 30% of all crops in the Vakinankaratra Region. Unusually, a new species of Rhombophryne frog known as Rhombophryne ellae was discovered during the cyclone– presumably as it was forced from its natural habitat.

Eventually, Severe Tropical Storm Eliakim impacted the same areas in March yet again. Response to Ava began in March at the same time after Eliakim impacted the country because of the lingering effects from Enawo impact, and thus response teams were responding to both tropical cyclones. Headed by United Nations Children's Fund, donors from across the country raised about nearly $1 million (2018 USD) to fund the relief efforts to meet the needs for children and their families that was affected by both tropical cyclones. United Nations Children's Fund also provided medical supplies, educational kits, nutritional goods, hygiene products and disinfection of wells for people in these impacted regions.

See also

Weather of 2017 and 2018
Tropical cyclones in 2017 and 2018
Cyclone Giovanna – made landfall in the Atsinanana Region of Madagascar six years earlier.
Cyclone Francisco – a weak tropical cyclone that affected similar areas two years later.

References

External links 

 Météo-France La Réunion 
 Joint Typhoon Warning Center (JTWC) 

Ava
Ava
Ava